Kevin Paul Pressman (born 6 November 1967) is an English football coach and former professional goalkeeper, who is the current goalkeeping coach for Grantham Town.

As a player he made over 500 appearances in both the Premier League and Football League, most notably with Sheffield Wednesday, whom he would make 404 appearances for over a seventeen-year spell at Hillsborough. After leaving Wednesday in 2004, Pressman went on to play for Stoke City, West Bromwich Albion, Leicester City, Leeds United, Coventry City, Mansfield Town and Scunthorpe United in the Football League, and also briefly played in Northern Ireland for Portadown before retiring in 2009. He was capped three times at England B level and had also made an appearance for the England U21s in 1988.

Following his retirement, he has worked as a coach for Belper Town, Bradford City and Millwall and Scunthorpe United.

Playing career

Sheffield Wednesday
Pressman is best remembered as the long-time goalkeeper of Sheffield Wednesday, where he spent 19 seasons, playing 478 matches in all competitions including the UEFA Cup. Pressman signed his first professional contract for the Owls on his 18th birthday in 1985 and made his debut against Southampton on 5 September 1987. He had supported Wednesday since childhood. Pressman's career was nearly wrecked on New Year's Day 1990 when he suffered cruciate knee-ligament damage which sidelined him for over eight months. He was unlucky not to play in the 1991 League Cup Final victory against Manchester United, as he had played in every round of the competition that year as well as a significant number of league matches until the quarter final stage where he was replaced by more senior goalkeeper and future Wednesday manager Chris Turner. Pressman was on the substitutes' bench at three further Wembley finals, all in 1993; the League Cup Final, FA Cup Final and FA Cup Final replay, all against Arsenal and resulting in defeats in both competitions for Wednesday.

In his prime, Pressman was considered one of the best goalkeepers in the Premiership. He had a tendency to play particularly well in Steel City Derby games. He also became known for both saving and scoring penalties, most notably the winner in a shoot-out against Watford in the FA Cup in 1998. Pressman entered the record books on 13 August 2000 when he was sent off after just 13 seconds in a match against Wolverhampton Wanderers. The dismissal, given for handling outside the area, was the fastest ever in English football history. Sheffield Wednesday went on to draw 1–1. It was bettered in late 2008 by David Pratt of Chippenham Town who was sent off three seconds into a game. Pressman showed great resilience to fend off many fellow goalkeepers for the number 1 shirt at Hillsborough, outlasting Chris Turner, Chris Woods and Pavel Srníček to name just a few. His last game for the Owls came on the final day of the 2003–04 season at Hillsborough against Queens Park Rangers.

Latter career
In the summer of 2005, Pressman was signed by Mansfield Town, at the time managed by his former Sheffield Wednesday teammate Carlton Palmer, and was first-choice goalkeeper for the majority of the following season. In addition to Sheffield Wednesday and Mansfield, Pressman has also played for Stoke City on loan and Leicester City. After being released by Leicester, he was signed by Leeds United as cover for Neil Sullivan, but never made an appearance.

Pressman announced his retirement from the game in July 2006 after being released by Mansfield Town although there were some rumours that he would return to Wednesday in a coaching role. He is now a member of Sheffield Wednesday's Masters team and is considered a legend at Hillsborough, where he was affectionately known as 'Big Kev'. He came top in a poll to find Sheffield Wednesday's greatest ever keeper on the website Vital Football.

At the end of September 2006 Pressman signed a short-term deal with Northern Ireland side Portadown FC, who had a goalkeeping crisis. He impressed Ports fans with his displays between the sticks, despite his age of 39, and helped the club in their rise up the league table. Despite training in Doncaster during the week and flying to Northern Ireland for matches, Pressman signed a contract extension with Portadown in late December 2006 that kept him at the club until the end of the 2006–07 season. At the end of that season he decided to call time on his impressive career after winning Portadown's 'Player of the Season' award.

International career
Pressman was never capped at senior level even though he was called up to the senior squad on numerous occasions, but did play for England at under-21 level as well as winning three "B" caps between 1994 and 1998.

Coaching career
Pressman holds an FA A coaching licence. In May 2007 he was appointed as goalkeeping coach under Nigel Adkins at Championship side Scunthorpe United and even featured on the substitutes' bench during a goalkeeping crisis at the club. He then progressed to his most high-profile coaching role, again at Scunthorpe, as assistant manager to Ian Baraclough. Both men, however, lost their jobs in March 2011 after a string of poor results left the Iron deep in relegation trouble.

In May 2008 he also became joint manager of Belper Town reserves.

On 20 August 2011 Bradford City announced that Pressman would be the new goalkeeping coach, replacing Tim Dittmer, who – with the club's blessing – left to take up a position at Premier League side Manchester City. On 21 June 2012 Pressman moved to the same role at Millwall.

On 1 June 2018, Pressman left Millwall, after six years.
 In July 2019, Pressman returned to Scunthorpe United as assistant manager of the U23 team and goalkeeper coach.

On 20 August 2021, he joined Non-League side Grantham Town as a goalkeeping coach to work alongside former Wednesday team mate and Town manager Carlton Palmer.

Personal life
Pressman is a lifelong supporter of boyhood club Sheffield Wednesday; having joined as a youth, he would go on to spend 19 years with the club as a professional. He is the brother of BBC Radio Sheffield presenter Howard Pressman. He is married to Joanne and has three children, Tom - who is also a goalkeeping coach, and in 2019 was signed by Sheffield United Women - Danny and Sophie.

On 3 September 1998, Pressman's  Mercedes-Benz S320 was stolen from his Chesterfield home at around 6:15am. Pressman was awoken by the noise and subsequently chased the thief for 15 miles, by car and on foot, before helping police to corner and arrest the man in a field.

Career statistics
Source:

A.  The "Other" column constitutes appearances and goals in the Full Members Cup, Football League Trophy and UEFA Cup.

References

External links
 

1967 births
Living people
England under-21 international footballers
England B international footballers
English footballers
People from Fareham
Premier League players
Sheffield Wednesday F.C. players
West Bromwich Albion F.C. players
Stoke City F.C. players
Leicester City F.C. players
Leeds United F.C. players
Coventry City F.C. players
Mansfield Town F.C. players
Portadown F.C. players
Scunthorpe United F.C. players
Association football goalkeepers
English Football League players
Bradford City A.F.C. non-playing staff
Millwall F.C. non-playing staff
Scunthorpe United F.C. non-playing staff
Association football coaches
Association football goalkeeping coaches